Struggle is an album by American rock band Nonpoint. It was released through the now defunct independent label Jugular Records.

Several of the songs were later re-used on the band's next album, Statement. The album was originally released independently as Separate Yourself in 1997. It has been reissued again under the original name with ":The Beginning 1997-1998" added on.

Critical reception
AllMusic wrote: "Melding funk and hardcore with their own vision of what rapmetal should sound like, Nonpoint managed to create a sound that isn't readily comparable to other groups."

Track listing
 "Preface" – 1:35
 "Mindtrip" – 3:48
 "Hive" – 5:35
 "Double Stacked" – 6:26
 "Senses" – 3:51
 "Years" – 3:55
 "Victim" – 4:00
 "No Say" – 4:00
 "Struggle" – 4:43
 "Two Tone" – 3:21
 "The Piper" – 3:39
 "Gimmick" – 4:00

Personnel 

Members
Elias Soriano - vocals
Robb Rivera - drums
Dru - guitar
Ken "K. Bastard" MacMillan - bass guitar

Production
Recorded by Jeremy Staska, @ Studio 13

References

Nonpoint albums
1999 debut albums
Albums produced by Jeremy Staska